John Paul Kelly (born 16 June 1987) is an Irish former professional footballer, best known for his spell with Bohemians.

Biography
Kelly began his career at Liverpool, playing in its academy set-up, before returning to Ireland due to homesickness. In 2005, he signed for Bohemians, and during his time there, won the Premier Division and the FAI Cup, both in 2008.

The following year, he signed for Drogheda United, but left the club after twelve games. In 2017, it was reported that he had returned to football, signing for amateur club St James's Gate.

References

1987 births
Living people
Bohemian F.C. players
Drogheda United F.C. players
Republic of Ireland association footballers
Republic of Ireland youth international footballers
Republic of Ireland under-21 international footballers
Association football midfielders